Christopher Wren Fussell (born May 19, 1976) is a retired Major League Baseball pitcher.

After attending Clay High School, Fussell was drafted in the 9th round of the 1994 MLB draft and he signed with the Orioles on June 14, 1994.

He began his professional career with the Gulf Coast Orioles in 1994 and began a slow, but steady, rise through the Orioles farm system with stops at Bluefield (rookie leagues), Frederick ("A" ball), Bowie ("AA") and Rochester ("AAA").

He made his major league baseball debut with the Orioles September 15, 1998, pitching five innings as the starting pitcher against the Texas Rangers. He gave up three runs and did not get a decision in the game. He pitched in  2 more games for the Orioles that year, finishing 0–1 with an ERA of 8.38 in 9.2 innings (3 games, 2 as a starter).

In 1999 he was traded to the Kansas City Royals for Jeff Conine. He spent most of the next two seasons on the Royals roster, primarily as a reliever with occasional starts. In 2001, he had surgery to remove bone spurs in his right elbow. He returned to the Royals in 2002 and spent the spring in big league camp and the 2002 season in Omaha.

After his release from the Astros in 2005, he played with the Independent League team the Camden Riversharks from 2005 until he was picked up by the Los Angeles Dodgers to provide bullpen depth for their "AAA" team, the Las Vegas 51s in 2007.

Fussell has a chapter giving advice in Tim Ferriss' book Tools of Titans.

References

External links

1976 births
Living people
Major League Baseball pitchers
Gulf Coast Orioles players
Bluefield Orioles players
Frederick Keys players
Bowie Baysox players
Rochester Red Wings players
Omaha Golden Spikes players
Gulf Coast Royals players
Omaha Royals players
Richmond Braves players
Nashville Sounds players
Camden Riversharks players
Round Rock Express players
Las Vegas 51s players
Baltimore Orioles players
Kansas City Royals players